The lake Rohrsee lies, as the Lichtsee, north of the village Obernberg am Brenner at  above sea level. On foot the lake can be reached by walking 500 m further east of Lichtsee.

Rohrsee shines with A grade water quality. Its environmental conditions, fauna and flora are almost identical with those of the Lichtsee. The Rohrsee is about two to five metres deeper.

Lakes of Tyrol (state)
LRohrsee